2nd Guards Brigade may refer to:

German
 2nd Guards Cavalry Brigade (German Empire)
 2nd Guards Artillery Brigade (German Empire)
 2nd Guards Infantry Brigade (German Empire)

Others
 2nd Guards Brigade (Croatia)
 2nd Guards Mixed Brigade (Japan)
 2nd Guards Brigade (United Kingdom)